Extreme is an American television adventure drama that premiered on ABC on January 29, 1995 following Super Bowl XXIX. Starring James Brolin, Extreme was centered on a search and rescue team which operated in the Rocky Mountains.

Although thirteen episodes were ordered and the network had enough faith in the series to give it the coveted post-Super Bowl timeslot, Extreme could not find an audience and ABC cancelled the series after seven episodes aired. The final episode aired on April 6, 1995, and the remaining six episodes were never aired in the United States.

The failure of Extreme forced a reconsideration of post-Super Bowl programming strategy by the major networks. NBC chose to commission a special episode of Friends to air immediately following Super Bowl XXX the next year and the experiment was such a success that the other networks have for the most part chosen to air one of their established series after covering the Super Bowl, with particular attention paid to season premieres of popular reality competitions like Survivor and The Voice.
The practice of premiering new series following the Super Bowl has not been fully discontinued; Fox debuted Family Guy in 1999, American Dad! in 2005, and 24: Legacy in 2016 while CBS launched Undercover Boss in 2010 and its reboot of The Equalizer in 2021.

Plot
A search and rescue team operates a Bell 204B "Super Huey" helicopter in the Rocky Mountains of Utah. The show features the trials and tribulations of the rescue team and the daring rescues undertaken in "Steep Mountain."

The series was filmed on location in Park City, Utah.

Characters
Reese Wheeler (James Brolin), a former downhill racer, is the seasoned leader of the Steep Mountain Rescue Unit.  Wheeler is both manager of and father-figure to the group.
Farley Potts (Tom Wright), a soft-spoken Vietnam vet and helicopter pilot.
Andie McDermott (Julie Bowen) part of the rescue team and love interest of Kyle Hansen.
Sarah Bowen (Brooke Langton)
Kyle Hansen (Cameron Bancroft), newest member of the team is grappling with the tragic death of his fiancée.
Callie Manners (Elizabeth Gracen)
Lance Monroe (Justin Lazard), a suave self-promoter who will stop at nothing to get what he wants
Skeeter (Danny Masterson)
Bones Bowen (Micah Dyer)

Episodes

See also
List of Super Bowl lead-out programs

References

External links

Television series by Universal Television
American Broadcasting Company original programming
1990s American drama television series
1995 American television series debuts
1995 American television series endings
Super Bowl lead-out shows
Aviation television series